Royal Noble Consort Suk of the Haeju Choe clan (Hangul: 숙빈 최씨, Hanja: 淑嬪 崔氏; 17 December 1670 – 9 April 1718) is one of best known consorts of Sukjong of Joseon and the mother of Yi Geum, King Yeongjo.

Biography

Early life
Lady Choe was born on the sixth day of the eleventh lunar month in the eleventh year of the reign of King Hyeonjong of Joseon, which translates to December 17, 1670 in the Gregorian calendar. She was the younger daughter of Choe Hyo-won, and Lady Hong of the Namyang Hong clan. She had one older brother, Choe Hu, who married Lady Ahn of the Sunheung Ahn clan and one older sister, Lady Choe of the Haeju Choe clan, who married Seo Jeon.

Palace maid
Lady Choe entered the palace at the age of 7. She belonged to the Cheonmin, which was the lowest class during the Joseon Dynasty. It is unknown how her first encounter with the King happened. The most accepted version is that she was a musuri (a water maid in the palace) during the time when Queen Inhyeon was exiled and Jang Ok-jeong had acquired the status of Queen. One night, Lady Choe was praying for the Deposed Queen's well-being when Sukjong, who was returning to the palace from a trip, overheard her and was moved by her words. The book Sumunrok (수문록, 隨聞錄) authored by Yi Mun-jeong (1656 – 1726) describes the events that led to the execution of Jang Hui-bin. The author who lived during Sukjong's time, recorded the encounter as follows:

"One night, the King [Sukjong] couldn't sleep, and suffering from insomnia decided to go out. When returning to the palace and passing by the servants' chambers, he suddenly heard sobbing coming from a small room. Out of curiosity, he took a peep into the room, then to his surprise in this neat and tidy room, he saw there was a setup of an offering for a banquet. He then saw a young palace musuri dressed in her official uniform, weeping bitterly in front of the table set for a memorial ritual. The memorial tablet was set for the former Queen Inhyeon. The King was surprised, since Queen Inhyeon had been deposed. The musuri had placed the memorial tablet because the deposed Queen Inhyeon had sacrificed herself for the King's sake. But fearing Queen Jang's influence, no one dared to commemorate the deposed Queen Inhyeon, as no one wanted to be accused and executed. The King was surprised that even under these perilous circumstances someone dared to risk death to honor and pray for Queen Inhyeon's well being, and he spoke to her. The musuri heard his voice, and turning around, was stunned to see the King. Recognizing him, she knelt before him and he asked her for an explanation. The musuri answered with a trembling voice, "Your Majesty, I used to serve under Queen Inhyeon when she was Queen. Today is her birthday, I cannot forget the kindness that Queen Inhyeon rendered to me when I served under her, thus privately I set a memorial for her. Please punish me with death." Hearing such an extreme plea, the King was taken aback and was astonished. Others in her situation would have played safe and not put themselves at risk, but this musuri risked death to honor her former Queen. Commendable and virtuous indeed was she and the King, finding himself witnessing this, was moved. He then brought the young musuri to his bed chambers. His feelings turned from sympathy into fondness and then into love, and he spent many nights with her. Over time, this musuri came to be known as Choe Suk-bin".

Royal Concubine
Lady Choe's status within the palace rose rapidly. In 1693, she became Sukjong's concubine with the fourth junior rank of Suk-won, after giving birth to a prince who died young. One year later, she was elevated to the second junior rank of Suk-ui, after giving birth to another son, Yi Geum, Prince Yeoning. In 1695, she was again elevated to the first junior rank of Gwi-in. In 1698, she gave birth to a stillborn prince. In 1699, she was again promoted to the first senior rank of Bin, with the adjective Suk (淑), meaning "pure/virtuous".

Lady Choe openly supported Queen Inhyeon and was against Jang Ok-jeong, whom history had described as an evil and cruel woman. By 1693, the King was growing disillusioned with Queen Jang and the Namin faction. In 1694, King Sukjong brought back Queen Inhyeon and demoted Jang Ok-jeong (Queen Buok) back to her previous rank, Hui-bin. 

In 1701, Queen Inhyeon died of an unknown cause. Some historiographers believe she was poisoned, but this is unconfirmed. According to one version, Sukjong found Jang Hui-bin in her room with a shaman, making merry over having caused the Queen's death through black magic. Another interpretation based on a vague passage of the Annals of the Joseon Dynasty states that it was Choe Suk-bin who told the King that sorcery had been used to try to bring harm to the Queen. Under the title "Queen's Will" it is written: 
"Choe Suk-bin with her usual grace gives tribute to the Queen [Inhyeon], and weeping for the one that could not win the heart of the King, she informed the King of the secret."
However, the Annals of the Joseon Dynasty recorded in 1701, state that Min Jin-won and Min Jin-hu, the deceased Queen Inhyeon’s older brothers, informed King Sukjong of Jang Hui-bin's sorcery, claiming that in doing so they were in compliance with Queen Inhyeon's last request to them before dying. According to Min Jin-won, the rumor in the palace was that Jang Hui-bin had been using a shaman to curse the Queen and she learned of these rumors.

Regardless of how the King learned of this, he decided to look into the matter and discovered the truth behind the rumors that Jang Hui-bin had built a shamanist altar within her quarters, where effigies with the name of the Queen were found. Later, her ladies-in-waiting declared that she had ordered them to shoot arrows at a portrait of Queen Inhyeon three times at day, and had buried dead animals in her palace's garden. Despite the many pleas of the Soron faction to pardon her, King Sukjong felt her conduct was too wicked, and in 1701, he ordered that Lady Jang and all the others involved should die by poisoning. After sentencing her, King Sukjong passed a law forbidding a concubine with the rank of Bin to become Queen.

A misunderstanding exists that Choe Suk-bin was the next in line to become Queen, but this has no basis. Two other concubines from the Yangban class, Gwi-in of the Miryang Park clan (later Royal Noble Consort Myeong), who gave birth to a prince in 1699, and Kim Gwi-in (later Royal Noble Consort Yeong), who was part of the same political faction as Lady Choe, were probably more suited for the position of Queen. Choe Suk-bin's lower class status was an impediment to her becoming Queen as Joseon was a Confucian society was ruled by the class system. We can clearly see this in the life of her son, King Yeongjo, who was threatened in the beginning of his rule partially because of his mother's class. Later, when his rulership was firmly established, he considered it a personal insult if his mother's background as a slave was mentioned.

Later life
Between 1699 and 1702, Choe Suk-bin was the principal benefactor of the Gakhwangjeon Hall, in Hwaeomsa temple.

In 1703, Queen Inwon adopted Prince Yeoning, who was known to be her favorite and whom she regarded as her own son.

In 1704, the Annals of the Joseon Dynasty state that for Yeoning's marriage, the King ordered a very grand and expensive ceremony. The nobles complained about the big cost and excessive favoritism showed to the Prince, since he was not even the Crown Prince, but the son of a concubine.
 
The Annals state that later that same year, Sukjong gifted his winter house, the Ihyeon Palace (where he had spent the days of his youth), to Choe Suk-bin. The residence was later conferred to their son to consummate his marriage in 1711. It is said that it was a large and spacious building, and was located in Hanseong (present-day Seoul).

In 1711, when Queen Inwon came down with smallpox, Lady Choe ordered the gungnyeo to go out of the palace and look for remedies among the commoners to save the Queen, who in the end survived.

In 1716, Choe Suk-bin was taken out of the palace while ill. Later that same year, Sukjong received a message from Yeoning informing him that his mother's health had worsened and asking for more medical help.

In 1717, Sukjong retired from politics and allowed his son, Crown Prince Yi Yun, to take over most of the affairs of the government.

Death
In 1718, Lady Choe died at the age of 47, in Ihyeon Palace. That same year, Sukjong declared the Crown Prince (future Gyeongjong of Joseon), as regent.

In her memorial tablet, under the description of her character it is written: 
"Her disposition and her status was absolutely indivisible. She did not scruple on people. She was respectful and always waited on Queen Inhyeon and later on Queen Inwon. Her wisdom and intelligence shined on her interaction with others. She kept to her duty and protocol. She never entered in palace disputes. She spent her days in peace and harmony."

Her tomb is located in Paju, Gyeonggi Province, South Korea. It is called Soryeongwon and was designated as Historical Site No. 358.

Sukjong died in 1720, supposedly after telling Yi Yi-myoung to name Prince Yeoning as Gyeongjong's heir.

When her son became King, he set up an altar (제실) near her grave, as a display of his deep filial piety. In addition to building tablet houses on the four spots around her grave, he also erected gravestones, the contents of which were written by him in her memory.

Her memorial tablet was enshrined in Chilgung (Historical Site No. 149), the place which houses the ancestral tablets of seven other royal concubines.

Choe Suk-bin was given the posthumous title Hwagyeong (화경, 和瓊), meaning "harmonious reverence". She was later elevated to Hwideok ("magnificent virtue") and to Ansun ("tranquil purity").

Controversy of rank
Her only surviving son was Prince Yeoning (Yi Geum, later King Yeongjo), who was known to be a child prodigy and became one of the greatest Kings in Joseon's history. King Sukjong was very proud and his treatment of him tended towards the lavish. But because the Prince was the son of a low-born concubine, the officials who were born in noble houses and had noble wives, maintained a condescending view of him and his mother, and were quick to lecture Sukjong on frugality and modesty, despite the King repeatedly ignoring them.

Although Yeongjo in his adulthood was very sensitive about the origins of his mother, one cannot deny the deep love he had for his birth mother. His reverence for her had no limit. He wrote many poems and said in one of them: 
"My father begot me, my mother fed me, led me, bred me, brought me up, reared me, kept her eye on me, tended me, at every turn aided me. Their goods deeds I would requite".
Yeongjo fought the court to have Choe Suk-bin recognized as a public mother, instead of being treated like other concubines—mothers of Kings, but regarded as a "private parent". But Yeongjo wanted to change that and have her as his "public mother". However, the officials were opposed to it as this meant the ministers would have to honor her and give the King the right to visit her tomb often as a part of his royal ceremonies.

During the time he was fighting this, there are two interesting accounts of his feelings about this situation. In 1739, the day before the scheduled visit to Lady Choe's tomb, dissatisfied with the protocols that the Board of Rites had drawn up, he censured two officials who were directly responsible for them. The Annals of the Joseon Dynasty explains the measure: 
"The King respectfully served his private parent Choe Suk-bin, but he suspected that the officials were unwilling to comply with his desire. Thus, on each occasion sudden clashes erupted, inevitably followed by a distressing royal declamation."
On another occasion, the King was leaving her tomb for the Palace. About to mount the palanquin, he instead summoned the Minister of Military Affairs, Kim Son-gung. Breaking into sobs, he said:
 "Since 1737, this was the first time I came to pay respect to my mother. For those years, my heart has been filled with sadness. When children fall down, they automatically call out for their mother. This is human nature. At the time of divination, if there is no person offering earth, how can there be a divination? I have sent down orders [to make his birth mother a public or legal mother], but the bureaus in charge have ignored them. True, the ruler is not allowed to have private concerns, but it is wrong to lose trust [in his officials]. The elite scholars of today are just too cold-hearted. Those elite scholar must also have parents. They could not have fallen from Heaven or sprung from earth."
In the end, he got what he wanted and Lady Choe was recognized as his public mother.

Family

Parents

 Father: Choe Hyo-won (최효원, 崔孝元) (23 February 1638 – 15 August 1672)
 Grandfather: Choe Tae-il (최태일, 崔泰逸)
 Great-grandfather: Choe Mal-jeong (최말정, 崔末貞)
 Great-great-grandfather: Choe Eok-ji (최억지, 崔億之)
 Grandmother: Lady Jang of the Pyeonggang Jang clan (평강 장씨, 平康 張氏)
 Mother: Lady Hong of the Namyang Hong clan (정경부인 남양 홍씨, 貞敬夫人 南陽 洪氏) (17 October 1639 – 18 December 1673)
 Grandfather: Hong Gye-nam (홍계남, 洪繼南)
 Grandmother: Lady Kim of the Gangneung Kim clan (정경부인 강릉 김씨, 貞敬夫人 江陵 金氏)

Sibling(s)

 Older sister: Lady Choe of the Haeju Choe clan (최씨, 崔氏)
 Brother-in-law: Seo Jeon (서전) 
 Niece: Lady Seo (서씨) 
 Nephew-in-law: Yi Hyeong-nyeon (이형년)
 Older brother: Choe Hu (최후, 崔垕)
 Sister-in-law: Lady Ahn of the Sunheung Ahn clan (숙부인 순흥 안씨, 淑夫人 順興 安氏)
 Nephew: Choe Su-gang (최수강, 崔壽崗) (? – 1749)
 Niece-in-law: Lady Kim (김씨) 
 Grandnephew: Choe Jin-hae (최진해, 崔鎭海)
 Grandnephew: Choe Jin-hyeong (최진형, 崔鎭衡)
 Niece: Lady Choe (최씨) 
 Nephew-in-law: Jo Tae-hang (조태항)
 Unnamed grandnephew
 Grandniece: Lady Jo (조씨)
 Grandniece: Lady Jo (조씨)
 Grandniece: Lady Jo (조씨)

Husband

 Yi Sun, King Sukjong (이순 숙종대왕) (1661 – 1720)
 Mother-in-law: Queen Myeongseong of the Cheongpung Kim clan (명성왕후 김씨) (1642 – 1684)
 Father-in-law: Yi Yeon, King Hyeonjong (이연 현종대왕) (1641 – 1674)

Issue

 Son: Prince Yeongsu (영수군) (1693 – 1693)
 Son: Yi Geum, King Yeongjo (이금 영조대왕) (1694 – 1776)
 Daughter-in-law: Queen Jeongseong of the Daegu Seo clan (정성왕후 서씨) (1692 – 1757)
 Daughter-in-law: Queen Jeongsun of the Gyeongju Kim clan (정순왕후 김씨) (1745 – 1805)
 Unnamed prince (왕자) (1698 – 1698)

In popular culture
 Portrayed by Lee Mi-yeong in the 1981 MBC TV series Women of History: Jang Hui-bin.
 Portrayed by Kyeon Mi-ri in the 1988 MBC TV series 500 Years of Joseon: Queen Inhyeon.
 Portrayed by Nam Joo-hee in the 1995 SBS TV series Jang Hui-bin.
Portrayed by Kim Young-ae in the 1998 MBC TV series The Great King's Road.
 Portrayed by Park Ye-jin in the 2002 KBS2 TV series Royal Story: Jang Hui-bin.
 Portrayed by Han Hyo-joo and Kim Yoo-jung in the 2010 MBC TV series Dong Yi.
 Portrayed by Han Seung-yeon in the 2013 SBS TV series Jang Ok-jung, Living by Love.
 Portrayed by Yoon Jin-seo in the 2016 SBS TV series Jackpot.

References 

17th-century Korean people
1670 births
1718 deaths
Royal consorts of the Joseon dynasty
17th-century Korean women
Choe clan of Haeju